Stanislau Zhurauliou (born April 14, 1988 in Homel) is a modern pentathlete from Belarus. He competed at the 2012 Summer Olympics in London, England, where he finished sixteenth in the men's event, with a score of 5,648 points.

Zhurauliou also won a silver medal at the 2012 UIPM World Cup in Rostov-on-Don, Russia. He currently works as a firefighter in a local department.

References

External links
  (archived page from Pentathlon.org)

1988 births
Living people
Belarusian male modern pentathletes
Olympic modern pentathletes of Belarus
Modern pentathletes at the 2012 Summer Olympics